Triangularia is a genus of fungi in the family Podosporaceae.

Species
Triangularia allahabadensis 
Triangularia angulispora 
Triangularia anserina 
Triangularia backusii 
Triangularia bambusae 
Triangularia batistae 
Triangularia bellae-mahoneyi 
Triangularia comata 
Triangularia longicaudata 
Triangularia macrospora 
Triangularia mangenotii 
Triangularia matsushimae 
Triangularia pauciseta 
Triangularia phialophoroides 
Triangularia pseudoanserina 
Triangularia pseudocomata 
Triangularia pseudopauciseta 
Triangularia setosa 
Triangularia striatispora 
Triangularia tanzaniensis 
Triangularia verruculosa

References

Sordariales
Taxa named by Karel Bernard Boedijn
Taxa described in 1934